Marco Rosa (born January 15, 1982) is a Canadian-born Italian professional ice hockey center who plays currently for Asiago of the  Alps Hockey League.  He was born in Scarborough, Ontario.

Playing career
Rosa began his career by spending two seasons playing for the Wexford Raiders of the OPJHL. He then attended Merrimack College from 2000 to 2004. He was drafted in the 8th round of the 2001 NHL Entry Draft (255th overall) by the Dallas Stars.

Although his Junior season with Merrimack was cut short after his wrist was broken in a victory over Boston College in February 2003, as a Senior he rebounded to lead the team with 15 goals scored. Since graduating, he has played seven seasons in the ECHL and AHL. In the 2009–10 season, Rosa led the Manitoba Moose in scoring with 55 points.

In 2010, he played with the Vancouver Canucks in the pre-season, but was reassigned to the Moose before the regular season began.

On July 20, 2011, Rosa, along with three other former Manitoba Moose players, signed with the soon to be named St. John's IceCaps. The franchise, which moved from Manitoba, is an affiliate of the Winnipeg Jets.

On June 21, 2013, after his first season abroad in Europe with the Espoo Blues of the Finnish SM-liiga, Rosa signed a one-year contract in Germany with Grizzly Adams Wolfsburg of the DEL in Germany. He eventually stayed until 2016 and reached the DEL finals with Wolfsburg in the 2015–16 season, where they fell short to München. In June 2016, fellow DEL team Krefeld Pinguine announced to have signed Rosa for the 2016–17 campaign.

Career statistics

Regular season and playoffs

International

References

External links

1982 births
Canadian ice hockey centres
Italian ice hockey players
Dallas Stars draft picks
Espoo Blues players
Houston Aeros (1994–2013) players
Krefeld Pinguine players
Living people
Long Beach Ice Dogs (ECHL) players
Manitoba Moose players
Merrimack Warriors men's ice hockey players
Milwaukee Admirals players
Canadian people of Italian descent
Providence Bruins players
Sportspeople from Scarborough, Toronto
Ice hockey people from Toronto
St. John's IceCaps players
Texas Wildcatters players
Grizzlys Wolfsburg players
Canadian expatriate ice hockey players in Finland
Canadian expatriate ice hockey players in Germany